The  Washington Redskins season was the franchise's 55th season in the National Football League (NFL) and their 51st in Washington, D.C. The team improved on their 10–6 record from 1985 and returned to the playoffs after missing them the previous year, finishing with a 12–4 record, a second place finish in the NFC East, and qualified for the playoffs as a wild card. They defeated the Los Angeles Rams in the NFC Wild Card Game at RFK Stadium, then upset the defending champion Chicago Bears in the Divisional Playoffs. The season came to an end in the NFC Championship Game when the Redskins were defeated by their division rivals, the New York Giants.

Offseason

NFL Draft

Roster

Regular season

Schedule

Note: Intra-division opponents are in bold text.

Season summary

Week 1 vs Eagles

Week 4: vs Seattle Seahawks

Standings

Playoffs

Schedule

NFC Wild Card Game

NFC Divisional Playoff

In knocking off the defending Super Bowl champion Bears, the Redskins scored their first road playoff win under Joe Gibbs.  It would not be the Gibbs-led Redskins' last road playoff win, though, as they scored wins in 1988  at Chicago, in 1990  at Philadelphia, in 1992 at Minnesota, and in 2005 at Tampa.

NFC Championship Game

References

Washington
Washington Redskins seasons
Wash